Ladislav Moc (17 September 1931 – 18 September 2022) was a Czech racewalker. He competed in the men's 20 kilometres walk at the 1960 Summer Olympics.

References

1931 births
2022 deaths
Athletes (track and field) at the 1960 Summer Olympics
Czech male racewalkers
Olympic athletes of Czechoslovakia
People from Kolín District